This is a list of Poets Laureate of Maryland.

Position and history

The Poet Laureate of Maryland is an honorary State position. The selected poet serves at the discretion of the Governor for up to a four-year term, renewable by the Governor's consent. The Poet Laureate provides public readings and special programs for the citizens of Maryland, ensuring that people in all geographic regions of the State have access to at least one reading during the term of service.

In the 18th century, Ebenezer Cook, author of the poem "The Sot-weed Factor: Or, A Voyage to Maryland (1708)", styled himself Maryland's Poet Laureate. Maryland did not have an official poet, however, until 1959. In that year, the Maryland General Assembly authorized the Governor to appoint a citizen of the State as Poet Laureate of Maryland (Chapter 178, Acts of 1959; Code State Government Article, sec. 13-306). Originally the term was for three years. Since then, some Poets Laureate have been reappointed. Vincent Godfrey Burns served the longest, for 17 years.

See also

Poet laureate definition and history
List of U.S. states' Poets laureate
Literature of Maryland
Southern United States literature Maryland has been historically considered a part of the American south

References and notes

 
 
History of Maryland
American Poets Laureate